Kudo or KUDO may refer to:

 KOAN (AM), a radio station (1080 AM) in Anchorage, Alaska, United States, which held the call sign KUDO from 2002 to 2013
 Kūdō, a martial art and a combat sport, also called daido juku

People
Kudō (工藤; Kudo, Kudoh, Kudou) is a Japanese family name.

, Japanese footballer
, Japanese ice hockey player
Chū Kudō (born Tetsusaburō Kudō, 1882–1965), Japanese-born Manchukuo politician and soldier
Elaine Kudo, ballet dancer
Haruka Kudo (singer) (born 1999), Japanese pop singer and member of Morning Musume
Haruka Kudō (voice actress) (born 1989), Japanese voice actor and model
Hirofumi Kudo (born 1959), Japanese curler, 1998 Winter Olympic participant
Kazuyoshi Kudo (c. 1937–2007), Japanese yakuza
, Japanese ice hockey player
Kimiyasu Kudō (born 1963), Japanese baseball player
Mai Kudō (born 1984), Japanese singer
, Japanese footballer
, Japanese animator
, Japanese boxer
Megumi Kudo (born 1969), retired Japanese professional wrestler
Minako Kudo (1967–2005), better known as Minako Honda, Japanese pop singer
, Japanese cross-country skier
Shizuka Kudō (born 1970), Japanese pop singer and former member of Onyanko Club
Tetsumi Kudo (1935–1990), Japanese artist
Tori Kudo, Japanese musician and founder of Maher Shalal Hash Baz
, Japanese para table tennis player
Youki Kudoh (born 1971), Japanese actress and singer
, Japanese footballer
Kudo (wrestler), Japanese professional wrestler
, Japanese actress, former singer with the group Morning Musume
, Japanese voice actress

Fictional characters
Booker Kudo (or Yūsaku Kudō), character in the manga series Case Closed
Harue Kudou, character in the manga series Gals!
Himiko Kudou, character in the manga series GetBackers
Hina Kudo, character in the Korean serial drama Mr. Sunshine
Jimmy Kudo (or Shinichi Kudō), protagonist of the manga series Case Closed
Kanae Kudō, character in the visual novel De Capo
Rei Kudou, character in the Arisa manga series
Shin Kudo, protagonist of the anime Macross Zero
Taiki Kudō, protagonist the anime series Digimon Xros Wars
Vivian Kudo (or Yukiko Kudō), character in the manga series Case Closed
Yohji Kudou, character in the Weiß Kreuz fictional universe
Yuichi Kudo, character in the Doki Doki School Hours anime and manga series

See also
Kudos (disambiguation)

Japanese-language surnames